Stackelbergia is a genus of flies in the family Stratiomyidae.

Species
Stackelbergia chloromyioides Pleske, 1930

References

Stratiomyidae
Brachycera genera
Diptera of Asia
Monotypic Brachycera genera